{{Infobox government agency
| agency_name = Manitoba Indigenous Reconciliation and Northern Relations
| type = Department
| nativename = 
| nativename_a = 
| nativename_r = 
| logo = Manitoba Aboriginal and Northern Affairs logo.png
| logo_width = 250px
| logo_caption = Logo of the Manitoba Aboriginal and Northern Affairs (1999-2016)
| seal = 
| seal_width = 
| seal_caption = 
| picture = 
| picture_width = 
| picture_caption = 
| formed = 
| preceding1 = Manitoba Aboriginal and Northern Affairs (1999-2016)
| jurisdiction = Government of Manitoba
| headquarters = Winnipeg, Manitoba
| coordinates = 
| employees = 94.00 FTE (2009-2010)
| budget = $40.9 m CAD (2009-2010)
| minister1_name = Eileen Clarke
| minister1_pfo = Minister of Indigenous Reconciliation and Northern Relations
| minister2_name = 
| minister2_pfo = 
| deputyminister1_name = Michelle Dubik
| deputyminister1_pfo = 
| deputyminister2_name = 
| deputyminister2_pfo = 
| chief1_name = 
| chief1_position = 
| chief2_name = 
| chief2_position = 
| parent_department = 
| parent_agency = 
| child1_agency = 
| child2_agency = 
| keydocument1 = Northern Affairs Act
| keydocument2 = Path to Reconciliation Act
| keydocument3 = Sioux Valley Dakota Nation Governance Act
| keydocument4 = ''Aboriginal Languages Recognition Act| website = 
}}Manitoba Indigenous Reconciliation and Northern Relations—formerly Manitoba Aboriginal and Northern Affairs—is the department of the Manitoba government responsible for issues related to Indigenous affairs and reconciliation in the province, and regional economic development in northern Manitoba..

The department is headed by the Minister of Indigenous Reconciliation and Northern Relations, currently Alan Lagimodiere. , there are 50 Northern Affairs communities over which the Minister has municipal authority.

 History 
Following the reorganization of the Manitoba cabinet after the general election of 2016, most of the responsibilities of the preceding Department of Aboriginal and Northern Affairs were transferred to the new Ministry of Indigenous and Municipal Relations''', under the direction of Eileen Clarke.

References

Indigenous affairs ministries
Ministries established in 1999
1999 establishments in Manitoba
Indigenous Reconciliation and Northern Relations